is a Japanese professional footballer who plays as a midfielder for WE League club Tokyo Verdy Beleza. She made her WE League debut on 16 October 2021.

References

Japanese women's footballers
Living people
Nippon TV Tokyo Verdy Beleza players
Women's association football midfielders
WE League players
2004 births